Ibac is a comics character.

IBAC may refer to:
IBAC (cycling team)
in-band adjacent-channel
Identity-based access control
Independent Broad-based Anti-corruption Commission (Victoria)
International Business Audit Consulting (IBAC) (Uzbekistan)
International Business Aviation Council
International Balloon Arts Conference (IBAC)

See also
LBAC, Lattice-based access control
RBAC, Role-based access control